Santo Sean Stephens (born June 16, 1969) is a former American football linebacker who played three seasons in the National Football League (NFL) with the Kansas City Chiefs, Cincinnati Bengals and Jacksonville Jaguars. He played college football at Temple University and attended Forestville High School in Forestville, Maryland.

Professional career

Kansas City Chiefs
Stephens signed with the Kansas City Chiefs on May 12, 1992. He was released by the Chiefs on September 1, 1992. He later rejoined the team and played in sixteen games for the Kansas City Chiefs in 1993.

Cincinnati Bengals
Stephens was signed by the Cincinnati Bengals on April 12, 1994. He played in fourteen games, starting three, for the Bengals during the 1994 season.

Jacksonville Jaguars
Stephens was selected by the Jacksonville Jaguars with the 25th pick in the 1995 NFL expansion draft and played in thirteen games for the team during the 1995 season. He recorded the first tackle in Jaguars history. He was placed on injured reserve with a knee injury by the Jaguars on August 19, 1996. Stephens was released by the Jaguars on October 18, 1996.

References

External links
Just Sports Stats
College stats

Living people
1969 births
Players of American football from Washington, D.C.
American football linebackers
African-American players of American football
Temple Owls football players
Kansas City Chiefs players
Cincinnati Bengals players
Jacksonville Jaguars players
21st-century African-American people
20th-century African-American sportspeople